The 2015 Wake Forest Demon Deacons football team represented Wake Forest University during the 2015 NCAA Division I FBS football season.  The team is coached by Dave Clawson, who is coaching his second season at the school, and plays its home games at BB&T Field.  Wake Forest competed in the Atlantic Coast Conference as part of the Atlantic Division, as they have since the league's inception in 1953. They finished the season 3–9, 1–7 in ACC play to finish in sixth place in the Atlantic Division.

Recruiting

Schedule

Coaching staff and roster

Coaching Staff

Roster

Game summaries

Elon
11th meeting. 9–0–1 all time. Last meeting 2009, 35–7 Demon Deacons in Winston–Salem.

@ Syracuse
5th meeting. 1–3 all time. Last meeting 2014, 30–7 Orange in Winston–Salem.

@ Army
15th meeting. 10–4 all time. Last meeting 2014, 24–21 Demon Deacons in Winston–Salem.

Indiana
1st meeting.

Florida State
34th meeting. 6–26–1 all time. Last meeting 2014, 43–3 Seminoles in Tallahassee.

@ Boston College
23rd meeting. 8–12–2 all time. Last meeting 2014, 23–17 Eagles in Winston–Salem.

@ North Carolina
106th meeting. 35–68–2 all time. Last meeting 2012, 28–27 Demon Deacons in Winston–Salem.

NC State
109th meeting. 38–64–6 all time. Last meeting 2014, 42–13 Wolfpack in Raleigh.

Louisville
3rd meeting. 0–2 all time. Last meeting 2014, 20–10 Cardinals in Louisville.

@ Notre Dame
3rd meeting. 0–2 all time. Last meeting 2012, 38–0 Fighting Irish in South Bend.

@ Clemson
81st meeting. 17–62–1 all time. Last meeting 2014, 34–20 Tigers in Winston–Salem.

Duke
96th meeting. 37–56–2 all time. Last meeting 2014, 41–21 Blue Devils in Durham.

Statistics

Scores by quarter

Offense

Rushing

Passing

Receiving

Scoring

References

Wake Forest
Wake Forest Demon Deacons football seasons
Wake Forest Demon Deacons football